The 2023 UEFA Assist U-17 Women's Championship is the 5th edition of SAFF U-15 Women's Championship, an international football competition for women's under-17 national teams, organized by SAFF in collaboration with UEFA. The tournament will be held in Bangladesh from 20 to 28 March 2023. Five teams from the region will take part.

Nepal is the defending champion having won the previous 2022 edition title for the finished top of the league table.

Player eligibility
Players born on or after 1 January 2007 are eligible to compete in the tournament.

Match officials

Referees
 Yangkhey Tshering
 Kanika Barman

Assistant Referees
 Prem Kumari Sunwar
 Choden Kingzang
 Radhika Shakya
 Abhirami Thambilali

Participating nations
Russia is set to feature in the tournament for the first time as a guest nation, following suspension by FIFA and UEFA for the 2022 Russian invasion of Ukraine.

Venue
All matches will be held at the BSSS Mostafa Kamal Stadium in Dhaka, Bangladesh

Tournament format
Single round-robin, each team will play each other. The team with the most points becomes champion.

Tiebreakers
Teams are ranked according to points (3 points for a win, 1 point for a draw, 0 points for a loss), and if tied on points, the following tiebreaking criteria are applied, in the order given, to determine the rankings.
Points in head-to-head matches among tied teams;
Goal difference in head-to-head matches among tied teams;
Goals scored in head-to-head matches among tied teams;
If more than two teams are tied, and after applying all head-to-head criteria above, a subset of teams are still tied, all head-to-head criteria above are reapplied exclusively to this subset of teams;
Goal difference in all group matches;
Goals scored in all group matches;
Penalty shoot-out if only two teams are tied and they met in the last round of the group;
Disciplinary points (yellow card = 1 point, red card as a result of two yellow cards = 3 points, direct red card = 3 points, yellow card followed by direct red card = 4 points).

League table

Standing

Matches
All times at local (UTC+6)

Statistics

Goalscorers

3 Goal
 Shilji Shahji
2 Goals
 Sree Moti Trisna Rani
 Thuinuye Marma
1 Goals
 Pooja
 Barsha Oli
 Mst Sultana Akter 
 Sauravi Akanda Prity 
 Munne  
.Mst Sagorika

See also
2023 SAFF U-20 Women's Championship

References

2023
2023 in women's association football
2023 in Asian football
2023 in Bhutanese football
2022–23 in Indian football
2022 in Maldivian football
2022–23 in Pakistani football
2022–23 in Sri Lankan football
2023 in youth association football
SAFF
SAFF